...Depends On What You Mean By Love is an EP by The Blackeyed Susans, released in late 1991.

Track listing 

 "Ocean of You" (David McComb) – 3:33
 "Close Watch" (John Cale) – 2:59
 "Will’s Blues" (Will Akers) – 3:22
 "Spanish is the Loving Tongue" (Traditional) – 2:59

Personnel 
 Rob Snarski – vocals
 Kenny Davis Junior – keyboards, piano accordion, samples
 David McComb – keyboards, bass, electric and acoustic guitars, backing vocals
 Joanne Alach – backing vocals

References

The Blackeyed Susans albums
1991 EPs